Alex Moffat (born 29 June 1968 in Workington, England) is a former rugby union player who played for Glasgow Warriors and Orrell. He played in the position of hooker.

Amateur career

Moffat played for Fylde Rugby Club in Lancashire from 1990-91.

He moved to Orrell in 1994, and stayed with them when they turned professional in 1995.

Moving to Scotland when Orrell returned to amateur status, Moffat played for Stirling County.

He rejoined Orrell, now an amateur club again.

He moved to Preston Grasshoppers in 2002.

In 2003 he played for Stirling County. In January 2004 he moved back to Fylde Rugby Club.

He moved back to Stirling County and was their captain. He retired from rugby in 2014.

Professional career

Moffat first tried his hand with professional clubs with Orrell in 1995. Orrell became an amateur club again in 2001 and Moffat found his way north to Stirling County and Glasgow Warriors.

In 2001-02 Moffat was called into Glasgow Warriors Heineken Cup squad for that season.

He was named in a combined Glasgow-Edinburgh team to play Newcastle Falcons development team on 17 September 2001. He replaced Peter Robertson in that match and the combined team had a comfortable victory, scoring seven tries.

References

External links
County complete double over Hawks - Daily Record
Inconsistency is the killer for County - Stirling News
Stirling v Bedford Blues, British & Irish Cup 2012-13
Stirling v Bedford Blues, British & Irish Cup 2012-13
Alex Moffat of Orrell

1968 births
Living people
Fylde Rugby Club players
Glasgow Warriors players
Orrell R.U.F.C. players
Rugby union players from Workington
Stirling County RFC players